Fred or Frederick Larson may refer to:

 Fred Larson (American football) (1897–1977), American football player
 Fred Larson (politician) (1913–1994), Canadian member of Parliament
 Frederick Larson (filmmaker), American lawyer, law professor and filmmaker